The 1996–97 Primera División de Fútbol Profesional season is the 45th tournament of El Salvador's Primera División since its establishment of the National League system in 1948. The tournament  began 1 September 1996 and was scheduled to end on July 27, 1997. Alianza won the two legged final over LA Firpo 3-2.

Teams

Managerial changes

Before the season

During the season

Playoffs

Preliminary finals

First legs

Second legs 

1-1. Aguila won 4-2 on penalty 

LA Firpo won 7-5 on aggregate 

Atletico Marte won 4-2 after extra time. Both team progressed

Semifinals

First legs

Second legs 

LA Firpo won 3-2 on aggregare

Alianza won 2-0 on aggregare

Third place match

Final

Alianza FC won 3-2 on Aggregate.

Top scorers

List of foreign players in the league
This is a list of foreign players in 1996-1997. The following players:
have played at least one  game for the respective club.
have not been capped for the El Salvador national football team on any level, independently from the birthplace

C.D. Águila
   Rogerio Martins Rocha
  Vladimir Avramovic
  Dragan Kovacevic
  Jorge Garay
  Jorge Villar

Alianza F.C.
  Leonardo Gaston Fioroto
  Horacio Lugo
  Marcelo Bauza
  Pedro Cubillo 
  Washington de la Cruz

Atletico Marte
  Alex Lopez
  Abdul Thompson Conteh
  Alejandro Larrea
  Raul Falero

Baygon-ADET
  Fernando de Moura
  Jorge Martinez Ogaldes

Dragon
  M.Ferreira
  Dennis Antonio Piedy
  P.Guidi
  Peter Mendez

 (player released mid season)
  (player Injured mid season)
 Injury replacement player

El Roble
  Ivan Nolasco

C.D. FAS
  Daniel Boscoso
  Onix Vargas
  Agustin Castillo
  Carlos Edgar Villarreal
  Jorge Mocecchi

C.D. Luis Ángel Firpo
  Fabio de Freitas
  Israel Castro Franco
  Raul Toro
  Richardson Smith 
  Percibal Piggott

Limeno
  German Rodriguez
  Radames Avila
  Franklin Delgado

Once Lobos
  Enriquez
  Juan Manuel Villarreal
  Marcelo Bruno
  Emiliano Pedrozo

External links
 
 
 

1997